Centron Corporation was a leading industrial and educational film production company, specializing in classroom and corporate 16mm films and VHS videocassettes. Although a slightly smaller company than its contemporaries (Encyclopædia Britannica Films, Coronet Films and Learning Corporation of America), it was nonetheless very successful from the late 1940s through the early 1990s, gaining added fame with the Academy Award-nominated Leo Beuerman in 1969.

Overview

Founded in 1947 in Lawrence, Kansas by boyhood friends Arthur H. Wolf (a veteran of another Kansas film company, Calvin Films) and Russell A. Mosser (of Boeing-Wichita), the name was chosen to incorporate the key words "central" (being that the company was located in the center of the United States) and "electronic" in honor of the "electronic age of the future".

Centron successfully competed with large companies on both coasts and was widely known for its high quality films, coming in on time and under budget. Although the company kept afloat for decades making many technical instructions, cooking and sewing demonstrations, teacher aides and safety prevention reels, it also added some social guidance films in the 1950s to compete with Coronet Films, along with zoological and geographic topics that held stronger interest among school students.

Harold "Herk" Harvey was a principal director at Centron. His 1962 feature Carnival of Souls was produced with several people associated with Centron. John Clifford, a Centron screenwriter, wrote the script for Carnival of Souls.

One of his most popular educational series covered the land and people "south of the border" (as the Middle America Regional Geography and La América del Sur series). Scripted by Peter Schnitzler and shot in many locations by cameraman Bob Rose, these were made under some (for that time) political difficulties. At one point, the series almost had to exclude Chile when government officials initially prevented film stock from leaving the country.

It was also during this period that the company expanded its distribution of outside productions, including a number of National Film Board of Canada titles. The 1970s was a particularly golden age for nature documentaries, especially the Elementary Natural Science series of the team of Karl and Stephen Maslowski.

In 1981, Wolf and Mosser sold Centron to the Coronet division of Esquire, Inc. Production carried on, mostly in Illinois, under the Coronet banner for a few years with Bob Kohl as primary head. In 1984, the Gulf and Western Industries conglomerate took over the mother company and, in a swift move, Kohl successfully purchased Centron from Gulf and moved production back to Lawrence, Kansas. After continuing through the end of the decade (including a series of instructional films for Encyclopædia Britannica), Kohl then sold the company facilities to the University of Kansas in 1991, with the library of films added to their archive by the time the company officially folded in 1994. Today, The Phoenix Learning Group currently has distribution rights to the Coronet library, including many of Centron.

Legacy
Although Centron won many awards for its films, it is most famous for the Oscar nominated Leo Beuerman. This simple profile of a short handicapped man with his tractor in downtown Lawrence  was produced on a budget of $12,000 and eventually became one of the most popular classroom films of all time, selling an impressive 2300 prints.
Some of their films were satirized on the cult TV series Mystery Science Theater 3000, including Cheating, Why Study Industrial Arts? and What About Juvenile Delinquency? (each directed by Herk Harvey).

List of films
This list is incomplete; you can help by expanding it.

See also 
Coronet Films
Encyclopædia Britannica
Educational Film 
Social guidance film
Travel documentary

Notes

References 

 Catalog of Copyright Entries: Third Series Volume 24, Parts 12-13, Number 1: Motion Pictures and Filmstrips 1970 Library of Congress 
 Catalog of Copyright Entries: Third Series Volume 25, Parts 12-13, Number 1: Motion Pictures and Filmstrips 1971 Library of Congress 
 Catalog of Copyright Entries: Third Series Volume 27, Parts 12-13, Number 1: Motion Pictures 1973 Library of Congress 
 Catalog of Copyright Entries: Third Series Volume 28, Parts 12-13, Number 1: Motion Pictures 1974 Library of Congress 
 Catalog of Copyright Entries: Third Series Volume 29, Parts 12-13, Number 1: Motion Pictures 1975 Library of Congress 
 Catalog of Copyright Entries: Third Series Volume 30, Parts 12-13, Number 1: Motion Pictures 1976 Library of Congress 
 Catalog of Copyright Entries: Third Series Volume 31, Parts 12-13, Number 1: Motion Pictures 1977 Library of Congress 
 Catalog of Copyright Entries: Fourth Series Volume 31, Part 4: Motion Pictures & Filmstrips 1980 Library of Congress 
 Educational Film Guide 1959 Annual Supplement 1959 H. W. Wilson Company 
 Motion Pictures 1940-1949 Catalog of Copyright Entries 1953 Library of Congress 
 Motion Pictures 1950-1959 Catalog of Copyright Entries 1960 Library of Congress 
 Motion Pictures 1960-1969 Catalog of Copyright Entries 1971 Library of Congress

External links 
imdb.com list
OCLC WorldCat search for Centron titles
 
profile of filmmaker Karl Maslowski
RiffTrax treatment of Shake Hands with Danger on official YouTube channel

Film production companies of the United States
Non-theatrical film production companies
Educational films
1994 disestablishments in the United States
1947 establishments in the United States
Mystery Science Theater 3000